Verftet is a neighbourhood of Bergen, Norway. It is located on the Nordnes peninsula.
It is the location of Georgernes Verft.

References

External links
 Official map of Bergen's traditional neighborhoods

Traditional neighbourhoods of Bergen